Pseudobrickellia is a genus of Brazilian plants in the tribe Eupatorieae within the family Asteraceae.

 Species
 Pseudobrickellia angustissima (Spreng. ex Baker) R.M.King & H.Rob. - Bahia, Piauí, Minas Gerais, D.F., Goiás 
 Pseudobrickellia brasiliensis (Spreng.) R.M.King & H.Rob. - Amazonas, Rondônia, Tocantins, Bahia, Ceará, Piauí, Minas Gerais, D.F., São Paulo, Goiás, Mato Grosso, Mato Grosso do Sul
 Pseudobrickellia irwinii R.M.King & H.Rob. - Minas Gerais, D.F.

References

Endemic flora of Brazil
Asteraceae genera
Eupatorieae